The seventh series of Love Island began broadcasting on 28 June 2021 and is hosted by Laura Whitmore on ITV2. Iain Stirling returned to narrate the series. The series was originally planned to air in the summer of 2020, but was postponed due to the ongoing COVID-19 pandemic.

Singer Mabel made a cameo appearance at a Spotify party in the villa performing some of her hits including her new single "Let Them Know".

On 23 August 2021, the series was won by Liam Reardon and Millie Court with 42.02% of the final vote, becoming the first couple of late entrants to win a series. Chloe Burrows and Toby Aromolaran finished as runners-up. This series was watched by an average of 4.17 million viewers which includes catch up figures.

Production
During the final of the previous series on 23 February 2020, it was confirmed that Love Island would return for a seventh series due to air later in the year. However, on 4 May 2020, Love Island announced the cancellation of the summer 2020 show due to the COVID-19 pandemic." It was later confirmed that the show would not be airing a winter version of the series in 2021 due to uncertainties regarding the pandemic and international travel.
On 4 March 2021, ITV confirmed that the show would return in the summer after an 18-month hiatus. In April 2021, during the application process, it was reported that LGBT contestants were being encouraged to apply for the first time, via dating app Tinder, however in June, ITV commissioner Amanda Stavri stated that the inclusion of LGBT contestants presents "logistical difficulties". The first 10-second trailer for the series aired on 29 May 2021 featuring presenter Laura Whitmore breaking a heart-shaped fire alarm with a hammer, followed by the tagline "This is not a drill". A full length trailer was released on 5 June 2021.
On 16 June 2021, ITV released details of its duty of care protocols for the new series, with detailed welfare plans in place to support participants before, during and after filming. Some of the episodes in this series were aired outside of the usual 9pm timeslot due to Euro 2020.

Islanders
The Islanders for the seventh series were released on 21 June 2021, just one week before the launch. The series was won by Liam Reardon and Millie Court.

Coupling
The couples were chosen shortly after the islanders enter the villa.

Notes

 : Chloe arrived after the coupling on Day 1, but was told she would be able to steal a boy for herself on Day 2. She picked Aaron F, leaving Shannon single and dumped.
 : Rachel arrived after the coupling on Day 5, and was told she had 24 hours to choose between the two single islanders, Brad and Chuggs. She picked Brad, leaving Chuggs single and dumped.
 : Original Islanders were only given the option to remain in their current couple, or re-couple with one of the new Islanders.

Weekly summary
The main events in the Love Island villa are summarised in the table below.

Ratings
Official ratings are taken from BARB which include ITV2 +1 and any playback within 7 days of the original broadcast. Because the Saturday episodes are "Unseen Bits" episodes rather than nightly highlights, these are not included in the overall averages. Week 3’s Sunday episode which aired on 11 July went up against 30 million viewers watching the UEFA Euro 2020 Final.

References

2021 British television seasons
Television productions postponed due to the COVID-19 pandemic
Love Island (2015 TV series)